Pi Kappa Sigma ( or Pi Kap) was a national collegiate sorority operating in the United States from November 17, 1894 until it was absorbed by Sigma Kappa in 1959. Pi Kap was the first pedagogical sorority.

History

Beginnings 
On November 17, 1894, in Ypsilanti, Michigan, nine female student from Michigan State Normal School formed a secret club called J.P.N. In a nod to the fashion of the day, the letters of this club stood for Jolly Petticoats Nine. Other J.P.N. members recall the secret meaning as Just Progressive Normalites. For three years, J.P.N. grew as a Latin-lettered club. In 1896, membership was thirteen.
 
In 1897, Alice Eddy Snowden assisted the J.P.N.s to transform themselves to a Greek-lettered organization. After careful consideration of Greek syntax and semantics, Pi Kappa Sigma was chosen as the name. 
 
Pi Kappa Sigma planted chapters at different campuses throughout the United States. In 1915, the sorority worked to become national. The first national convention was held. There, goals for increasing membership and chartered chapters were established. A new membership pin was designed. The constitution was revised. Authorization for a publication (the Laurel) was given.
 
Pi Kappa Sigma's status as a "pedagogical sorority" prevented it from being admitted into the National Panhellenic Conference.

The Association of Education Sororities 
In 1917, two members of the Association for Pedagogical Sororities (A.P.S.), Sigma Sigma Sigma and Alpha Sigma Alpha, invited Pi Kap to join their association. Pi Kap accepted, and was soon joined by Delta Sigma Epsilon. At the third national convention of A.P.S., the sororities changed A.P.S. to Association of Education Sororities (A.E.S.) Over the next decade, Theta Sigma Upsilon, Alpha Sigma Tau, and Pi Delta Theta became A.E.S. members.

Becoming an NPC Sorority 
In November 1947, the National Panhellenic Conference (NPC) invited Pi Kappa Sigma and her A.E.S. peers into "associate membership with reservations." With this invitation the A.E.S. immediately dissolved.  In June of the following year, the reservations cited by the NPC were removed. The former A.E.S. sororities became associate members of the NPC. Pi Kappa Sigma, in a 1949 publication, hoped to become a full member by 1951.

There were two problems for Pi Kappa Sigma and the move into the NPC. First, many Pi Kaps also held membership in NPC groups, having joined before 1947. These sisters were forced to choose between Pi Kap and their NPC sorority. Pi Kap, like all sororities faced with this adjustment, suffered losses. 
 
The second problem was the chartering of chapters at "unqualified institutions". Under the rules of the NPC, Pi Kap had to withdraw such chapters from the roll until those institutions could attain the proper accreditation. Again, Pi Kap lost members. 
 
The history book (1949) included total membership records after the NPC affiliation. The "grand total membership" was 9,241 sisters. There were 32 active chapters and 15 inactive.

National conventions were held every two years from 1915 up to 1931, then every three years.

Merging with Sigma Kappa 
Pi Kappa Sigma remained an NPC affiliated sorority for only ten more years. In 1959, it was absorbed by Sigma Kappa.

Insignia and Traditions 
The first badge was a shield design with "thirteen turquoise set in laurel leaves surrounding Pi Kappa Sigma" 
 
At the first convention, a new badge was designed. The younger Pi Kaps wanted "one with a more definite shield patterns and something symbolic of secrecy". The sisters claimed that since other sororities had pins symbolizing secrets, so should the Pi Kappa Sigmas.
 
The second badge was a "modified triangular shield with a narrow gold bevel surrounding a field of black enamel. At the top is a small diamond surrounded by thirteen points of gold. Across the center of the field are the Greek letters Pi Kappa Sigma in gold, and beneath them a Greek lamp in gold."
 
The pledge pin was a "triangle slightly modified; upper part is of turquoise-blue enamel with the letters Pi Kappa Sigma in gold."
 
The coat-of-arms was authorized by the Grand Chapter in 1927 and is described as a "quartered shield [gold and blue] shaped like the pin. Upper dexter quarter is a Greek lamp; in the lower sinister quarter, a five point star; at the point of interest, overlapping the quarters is an open book. The crest is an effulgent star of thirteen points resting upon a wreath. Beneath the shield are two crossed laurel branches; below them is a scroll with Pi Kappa Sigma in Greek letters."

The first initiation ritual was that of J.P.N. In October 1902, there was a new initiation and pledge rituals recorded by hand. These rituals were "very similar" to what the sorority was using in 1949.  Minor changes in phrasing and a few additions were done in later years.
 
Pledge ribbons were given to new members before the official pledging ceremony.

Founder's Day Prayer 
Our heavenly Father, we thank thee for the joy of this day. We lift our voices in praise and thanksgiving for the blessings and comforts which come to us through our founders. We thank thee for all the tender mercies of the past and the great hopes that lead us into the future. We pray to fix in all our hearts the bright resolves to live nobly, truly, simply, and in the real spirit of Pi Kappa Sigma. May we, as loving children, remember that we are in the springtime of life. Help us to seize and improve every opportunity for the cultivation of our minds, the foundation of habits the preparation for future usefulness and gaining good. Lord, be near all on this day, and when we come together again, with thy help, O Lord, may we be better able to help each other and live that we may not forget the purpose for which we were founded and the all embracing love enclosed in the everlasting chain of friendship for Pi Kappa Sigma. We ask all these things in Jesus' Name. Amen. —Written by Ruth S. Neidig, Grand President

An Ideal of Pi Kappa Sigma 
Pledges herself to service of all on campus within the limits of her capacity.
In at home in the universe because in giving self she finds herself. 
Keeps her sense of values, especially in emergencies. 
Appreciates the contributions of townspeople, faculty, and students. 
Promises to do only what she can see through to a finish. 
Praises rather than blames the efforts of others. 
Adjusts to situations where the good of her group surpasses her own personal opinion. 
Stands by her ideals of Christian living. 
Ignores gossip and fault finding. 
Grows in poise and confidence. 
Matures in her relationships with people. 
Adds to life because of her humor, buoyancy, and wholesomeness. —Virginia Wielandy, Faculty Advisor Alpha chapter

Chapters
Total membership reported in the 1957 Baird's Manual was 11,013, two years prior to the merger with Sigma Kappa.
1894 Α, Michigan Normal
1900 Β, Northwestern State (Oklahoma)
1902 Γ, Central Michigan
1905 Δ, Eastern Washington (d. 1918)
1907 Ε, Wisconsin State—Milwaukee (d. 1911)
1909 Ζ, Indiana of Pennsylvania (inactive 1918-30)
1915 Η, Miami (Ohio) (d. 1938)
1917 Θ, U of Cincinnati (d.1919)
1918 Ι, Emporia State (Kansas)
1919 Κ, Southeastern State (Oklahoma)
1920 Λ, Central Missouri State
1920 Μ, Colorado State College of Education
1922 Ν, East Central State (Oklahoma)
1923 Ξ, Ohio U (d. 1933)
1923 Ο, Marshall College
1924 Π, Northeast Missouri State
1925 Ρ, SUNY Buffalo (d.1954)
1925 Σ, Drake U. (d. 1932)
1925 Τ, Chico State (California)
1925 Υ, Florida State U (d. 1929)
1926 Φ, UCLA (d. 1939)
1926 Χ, Black Hills Teachers College (S. Dakota)
1926 Ψ, Kent State (d. 1947)
1927 Ω, USC (California) (d. 1940)
1927 ΑΑ, Alabama Polytechnic (i.e., Auburn) (d. 1937)
1928 ΑΒ, Pittsburg State (Kansas) (d. 1941)
1928 ΑΓ, Wayne State U.
1928 ΑΔ, Northwestern Louisiana
1928 ΑΕ, Longwood (Virginia)
1929 ΑΖ, Western State (Colorado)
1929 ΑΗ, Millikin U (d. 1937)
1929 ΑΘ, Stetson (Florida) (d. 1940)
1929 ΑΙ, Butler (d. 1937)
1930 ΑΚ, Harris Teachers' College
1930 ΑΛ, Wittenberg (d. 1936)
1930 ΑΜ, Fort Hays State (Kansas) (d. 1940)
1935 ΑΝ, Lock Haven (Pennsylvania)
1939 ΑΞ, Southern Illinois
1939 ΑΟ, Madison College (Virginia)
1943 ΑΠ, Western Illinois
1944 ΑΦ, Arkansas State Teachers
1945 ΑΧ Ball State
1945 ΑΡ, Northern Illinois State
1946 ΑΣ, Henderson (Arkansas) (d. 1952)
1946 ΑΤ, Dist. of Columbia Teachers
1947 ΘΝ, Southwest Missouri State
1948 ΑΩ, Fairmont State (West Virginia)
1950 ΑΥ, Central State (Oklahoma)
1951 ΓΘ, Radford (Virginia)
1954 ΑΨ, U. of Illinois

References 

Defunct former members of the National Panhellenic Conference
1894 establishments in Michigan
Sigma Kappa
Student organizations established in 1894